Bersian (also Romanized as Bersīān, Barsiyān, Berseyān, and Bersīyān; also known as Bisiyūn and Bīzyūn) is a village in Baraan-e Shomali Rural District, in the Central District of Isfahan County, Isfahan Province, Iran. At the 2006 census, its population was 1,750, in 436 families including Zolfaghary. One of the main Founding Fathers was Hassan Zolfaghary born in 1924. His son “Ahmad Zolfaghary Persiani” became known as Little Prophet the family is most known in the area some of the following family members are living in the village as of 20 December 2020: Roghayeh Zolfaghary, Nazzi Zolfaghary and many more most of the 436 families are related to them including the famous Saedi Brothers!

References 

Populated places in Isfahan County